The 2019 Akron Zips football team represented the University of Akron during the 2019 NCAA Division I FBS football season. The Zips were led by first-year head coach Tom Arth and played their home games at InfoCision Stadium in Akron, Ohio. They competed as members of the East Division of the Mid-American Conference (MAC).

The 2019 Zips lost every single game on their schedule, finished with an 0–12 overall record and an 0–8 record in MAC play, and were outscored by their opponents by a total of 435 to 126. They finished in last place in the conference's East Division. CBS Sports rated Akron dead last, at 130th, in their season's-end ranking of all 130 FBS teams. The Zips were the only Division I FBS team to go winless in the 2019 season.

Preseason

Coaching changes
Following the firing of seven-year head coach Terry Bowden at the end of the 2018 season, Akron announced the hiring of Tom Arth on December 14, 2018. Arth had spent the previous two seasons as the head coach at the University of Tennessee at Chattanooga, leading them to records of 3–8 and 6–5 in 2017 and 2018, respectively. Before Chattanooga, he was the head coach at John Carroll University, where he led the team to an upset victory over No. 1 Mount Union to claim an Ohio Athletic Conference title in 2016 and was named D3football.com Coach of the Year.

Tom Arth announced the members of his coaching staff in January and March 2019. Among them were defensive coordinator Matt Feeney and offensive coordinator Tommy Zagorski, who both served in the same roles on Arth's staff at Chattanooga.

MAC media poll
The MAC released their preseason media poll on July 23, 2019, with the Zips predicted to finish in fifth place in the East Division.

Schedule
Akron's non-conference slate will consist of home games against UAB of Conference USA and Troy of the Sun Belt Conference, and road games against Illinois of the Big Ten Conference and UMass, a football independent.

In Mid-American Conference play, the Zips hosted Kent State, Buffalo, Eastern Michigan, and Ohio, and traveled to Central Michigan, Northern Illinois, Bowling Green, and Miami. They did not play West Division members Ball State, Toledo, or Western Michigan.

Source:

Personnel

Coaching staff

 Tom Arth - Head coach
 Matt Feeney – Defensive Coordinator / Inside Linebackers
 Tommy Zagorski – Offensive coordinator / Offensive Line
 Brian Cochran – Defensive Line
 Chris Cook – Tight ends / Offensive Tackles 
 Jonathan Cooley – Defensive Backs / Corners & Nickels
 Jayden Everett – Running Backs
 Shelton Felton – Outside Linebackers / Defensive Ends
 Bryan Gasser – Pass Game Coordinator / Wide Receivers
 Chris Hurd – Special Teams / Fullbacks / Halfbacks
 Oscar Rodriguez – Secondary / Safeties

Game summaries

at Illinois

UAB

at Central Michigan

Troy

at UMass

Kent State

Buffalo

at Northern Illinois

at Bowling Green

Eastern Michigan

at Miami (OH)

Ohio

References

Akron
Akron Zips football seasons
College football winless seasons
Akron Zips football